"The Lincolnshire Poacher" is a traditional English folk song.

The Lincolnshire Poacher may also refer to:

 Lincolnshire Poacher (numbers station), a shortwave radio station
 Lincolnshire Poacher cheese, a type of cheese